Bathory (also released as Bathory: Countess of Blood) is a 2008 historical drama written and directed by Juraj Jakubisko. Filming began in December 2005, and the film was released in July 2008. It was Jakubisko's first English-language film and an international co-production between the cinemas of Slovakia, the Czech Republic, Hungary, and the United Kingdom.

Plot
The film is based on the story of Erzsébet Bathory, a Hungarian countess in the 16th and 17th centuries.  Her story takes place in a part of the Kingdom of Hungary that is now Slovakia. In this retelling, the Countess is a healer who conducts medical experiments and rudimentary autopsies in a "hospital" beneath her castle. She forms a relationship with a reputed witch, Darvulia, who saves her from poisoning. The witch promises Erzsebet a son and eternal beauty. In return, Erzsebet must sacrifice both love and her reputation. Darvulia becomes Erzsebet's companion. Meanwhile, maidens in the area have been dying of seemingly unrelated causes, and Erzsebet is seen bathing in a large tub of red liquid as the girls' now-mutilated corpses are buried nearby. Two monks later conclude that the water is not blood but is simply colored red by herbs.

After her husband Ferenc Nádasdy's death, Erzsébet quarrels with his scheming friend György Thurzó, who tries to proposition her at her husband's funeral. Thurzo's lover, who is gifted with herbs, offers to help him get revenge for the rejection. Soon afterward, Erzsebet begins to have surreal visions and episodes. In one of these, she stabs a woman to death with scissors. Afterwards, she confesses to Darvulia that she can no longer tell dream from reality. Darvulia discovers that someone has been placing hallucinogenic mushrooms in Erzsébet's drinks; Erzsébet cannot remember clearly and believes Darvulia responsible. She has the woman thrown out. Thurzó and his wife then capture Darvulia and torture her, cutting out her tongue. Before she dies, she writes Thurzó's name in blood on her cell wall. Erzsébet swears vengeance on him.

Thurzó enlists Erzsébet's sons-in-law and other allies to prosecute her for witchcraft. When their plans repeatedly fail, they nonetheless capture the Countess and torture members of her household to try to obtain incriminating information. The servants are then executed for their alleged crimes, and Erzsébet is imprisoned. Despairing over her separation from her son, she lies on her bed and begins to sing a hymn; the flames from her candles rise and engulf her in flames. Upon hearing of her death, Thurzo concedes that she has once again made the move he least expected, as when they once played chess together, and admits that he has always loved her.

Cast

Production
Juraj Jakubisko declared in an interview:

Casting
In late January 2006, Famke Janssen was announced to play Báthory, and her photos with Jakubisko showed up in the media. Her first appearance was planned for 6 March 2006. Meanwhile other sequences (those not involving her) were being shot. Around 8 March 2006, news agencies reported that Janssen had been replaced by the English actress Anna Friel.

Financing and production companies
The budget of 10 million EUR (around 15 million USD) makes it the most expensive Slovak film and second most expensive Czech film. The film is a joint effort of Slovak, Czech, British, and Hungarian production companies: Jakubisko Film Slovakia s.r.o. (SK), Eurofilm Studio KFT (HU), Jakubisko Film, s.r.o. (CZ), Lunar Films Ltd (UK) and Concorde Film Trust (HU) with additional government funding provided by Eurimages (EU), the Ministry of Culture of the Slovak Republic (SK), and Czech Film Fund (CZ).

Accolades 
 Czech Lion 2008  • The most successful movie  • The best artistic asset of the year  • The best artist and artistic concept  • The best costume designer
 Monaco Charity Film Festival 2010  • The Best Artistic Achievement
 WorldFest-Houston International Film Festival 2011  • REMI Special Jury Award in Historical/Period piece  • REMI Gold Award for "Best Art Direction"

References

External links

Audiovisual content

websites
 
 About Bathory
 The Hollywood reporter review
 
 

2008 films
2008 fantasy films
Slovak LGBT-related films
Czech LGBT-related films
Hungarian fantasy films
Hungarian LGBT-related films
British fantasy films
British LGBT-related films
English-language Slovak films
English-language Czech films
English-language Hungarian films
Films directed by Juraj Jakubisko
Films set in Hungary
Films set in Slovakia
Films set in the 16th century
Films set in the 1600s
Films set in the 1610s
Films shot in Austria
Films shot in Hungary
Films shot in Slovakia
Films shot in the Czech Republic
Religious horror films
2000s serial killer films
LGBT-related horror films
Films scored by Simon Boswell
2000s biographical films
Czech historical films
Hungarian historical films
British historical films
2008 LGBT-related films
Slovak historical films
2000s English-language films
2000s British films
British epic films
Czech epic films
Hungarian epic films
Slovak epic films